Mauk may refer to:

Places
Mauk, Iran
Mauk, Georgia
Mauk, Tangerang
Maukspitze

People
Ben Mauk (b. 1985), American football quarterback 
Bill Mauk, American politician
Stefan Mauk, Australian footballer
Mauk Weber (1914-1978), Dutch football defender